Peter Plaugborg (born 12 April 1980) is a Danish actor.

Filmography

References

External links 

1980 births
Living people
Danish male film actors